Shockway Rider is an action fighting and shooting game released for the Amstrad CPC, the Commodore 64, and the ZX Spectrum. It was developed by Carter Follis Software Associates and was released in 1987.

The game takes place in the future where cities are surrounded by "shockways," moving pedestrian walkways. The player must make their way around the town on the shockway while avoiding pedestrians and obstacles.

References

1986 in video gaming
Commodore 64 games
ZX Spectrum games
Amstrad CPC games
Action video games
Video games scored by Barry Leitch
Video games scored by Rob Hubbard
Video games developed in the United Kingdom